Gabriel Strum, known professionally as Japanese Wallpaper, is an Australian indie pop singer-songwriter and producer. He released his debut single "Breathe In" featuring Wafia on 10 October 2013. The song featured in Zach Braff's film Wish I Was Here. Strum has had three songs feature in the Triple J Hottest 100: "Between Friends" featuring Jesse Davidson at No. 97 (2014), "Forces" featuring Airling at No. 69 (2015) and "In Motion" featuring Allday at No. 44 (2017). He released his debut album Glow on 18 October 2019.

Biography 
Strum is originally from Melbourne, and was the winner of Triple J Unearthed High competition in 2014.

Since then, he has studied music composition and has produced for numerous notable Australian acts including: Mallrat, Holy Holy, Wafia, Eilish Gilligan, Bec Sandridge and Allday.

Japanese Wallpaper served as the support act for Lily Allen on her 2019 national tour of Australia.

Discography

Albums

EPs

Singles

As lead artist

As featured artist

Awards and nominations

AIR Awards
The Australian Independent Record Awards (commonly known informally as AIR Awards) is an annual awards night to recognise, promote and celebrate the success of Australia's Independent Music sector.

|-
| rowspan="2"| AIR Awards of 2015
| themselves
| Breakthrough Independent Artist
| 
|-

APRA Awards
The APRA Awards are presented annually from 1982 by the Australasian Performing Right Association (APRA), "honouring composers and songwriters". They commenced in 1982.

! 
|-
| 2022 
| "Closer" by Ngaiire (Ngaiire, Jack Grace, Gabriel Strum)
| Song of the Year
| 
| 
|-

J Award
The J Awards are an annual series of Australian music awards that were established by the Australian Broadcasting Corporation's youth-focused radio station Triple J. They commenced in 2005.

|-
| J Awards of 2014
| themselves
| Unearthed Artist of the Year
|

Music Victoria Awards
The Music Victoria Awards are an annual awards night celebrating Victorian music. They commenced in 2006.

! 
|-
| 2022
| Gabriel Strum
| Best Producer
| 
| 
|-

National Live Music Awards
The National Live Music Awards (NLMAs) are a broad recognition of Australia's diverse live industry, celebrating the success of the Australian live scene. The awards commenced in 2016.

|-
|  2017
| Japanese Wallpaper
| Live Electronic Act (or DJ) of the Year
| 
|-

References

External links 

 

1997 births
Living people
21st-century Australian singers
21st-century Australian male singers